Don Kai Di is a tambon (sub-district) in Krathum Baen District, Samut Sakhon Province, outskirts Bangkok.

History
Its name "Don Kai Di", directly translated as "upland of good roosters", because locals prefer to raise fighting cocks.

Don Kai Di is considered the tip of Khlong Phasi Charoen before it empties to confluence the Tha Chin River at Ang Thong Watergate near local temple Wat Ang Thong.

In the past, in case of flood water came from Bangkok, it would be diverted to the sea via Tha Chin River. They will open watergates all the time so the water of Khlong Phasi Charoen was clear. As time passes, there are a number of plants along the canal. Most of them discharge wastewater here. Water in Kathum Baen and Don Kai Di is polluted. With all factories, Samut Sakhon turned into an industrial city.

Don Kai Di is home to the Thai of Chinese descent which has inherited until today. Benjarong (a traditional Thai five-coloured porcelain) is a good stuff here.

Geography
Don Kai Di with an area of 5,179 rais (5.2864 mi2). Most of the area is floodplains near the mouth of Khlong Phasi Charoen, some areas are upland. Most of the area is used for agriculture.

Adjoining sub-districts are (from the north clockwise): Talat Krathum Baen in its district, Khlong Maduea in its district, Na Di and Ban Ko of Mueang Samut Sakhon District, Tha Sao in its district.

Administration
Don Kai Di is administered by the Thesaban Tombon (Subdistrict-Municipality) Don Kai Di (เทศบาลตำบลดอนไก่ดี).

The area also consists of six administrative mubans (village)

Local products
Benjarong
Snakehead spicy chili sauce

References

Tambon of Samut Sakhon Province